Elle is a popular bat-and-ball game in Sri Lanka which is also a localised name for slow-pitch softball, often played in rural villages and urban areas. From modern-day sports popular around the world, Elle has the most similarities with softball. The game is played between two teams and the play scenario involves a hitter, a pitcher and fielders. The hitter is given three chances to hit the ball pitched at him or her. A strikeout happens if the hitter's ball is caught by the fielding side or if the fielding side is able to hit the hitter with the ball while he or she is in the course of completing a run. The hitter can stop only at one of the three stoppings in the round thereby paving the way for another member of his team to come and become the hitter. The side that gets the highest number of (complete) runs wins the match.

History

Roots of the game 
Historians suggest the game existed from the early 20th century in Sri Lanka. It is not clear who first introduced the game to the island. Even though one cannot find definitive sources on the origin of the sport, it can be anticipated British have introduced the game to the island along with Cricket. Elle has common attributes with the ancient British game Rounders, along with the modern game of Softball. The old British game of Stoolball also has some common attributes with modern-day cricket, baseball, softball, and Elle.

A team photograph of an Elle team called ‘Hendala Greyhounds’, which dates back to 1911, depicts the team members after a game of Elle, has been published. (Source?) This indicates that the game may have been played by numerous organized groups from diverse areas. (Why?) The fact that the players in the photograph were clad in European attire instead of sportswear indicates that the game might have been popular among the middle-class population of the era. (Why?) The players are seen wearing neckties and suit coats. Existence of Elle in and around the Hendala area as far back as 1900, is not accidental. It suggests that the game was an integral part of the lives of the people of such areas. It was deeply ingrained in their society which treated it as a powerful, attractive sport and was often played in a festive setting. In predominantly Christian areas, people used to organize a game of Elle to coincide with the church feast (which?) which was invariably held on a Sunday.

Equipment used in the past 
Simple yet sturdy sticks made the early bat while the improvised ball was sometimes a dried fruit of Wel Kaduru (Cerbera manghas). After reaping the harvest from their paddy fields, farmers would gather together with their families by the now barren fields and play Elle to celebrate the joy of a well-earned break.

The Elle culture in the past 
In rural Sri Lankan villages, an Elle game was a communal activity enjoyed by the whole village despite the age or gender. It is a time to enjoy, laugh and cheer on your loved ones and neighbours as the whole village would break into teams and play the game as a tournament. Elle would also be played as regional tournaments where teams representing adjacent villages or towns would battle to win the title of best Elle team. This would gradually spread to national level championships played with good cheer.

Play 
In a match, the maximum number of players in a team is sixteen with the minimum being twelve. The team with the lesser number would not usually call for the excess number of players to be removed from the opposing team. Instead, the additional players in the larger team could be included in the line up prior to the commencement of the third innings. Striking or fielding could be decided upon by the toss of a coin.

Elle ground 
The playing area should be without obstructions especially to the running area. It should have an identical distance to the front and the two sides. The playing area should be marked with a line of 3 centimetres in breadth leaving at least five meters to the back of the striking spot.

Note: For matches played by school children the running distance between the bases would be less. Accordingly, for school matches the distance would be 11 m whereas for other matches arranged at sports society levels the distance would be 12 m.

Materials 

Equipment used in the playing area:

Two posts ten meters in height similar to a bamboo tree, six posts two centimetres in breadth and one meter in height and eight flags to be tied to the end of the posts. (The height of posts from ground level should be 1 meter.)
The Elle bat should be made out from well-seasoned bamboo and the length and breadth of the bat can be in accordance with the requirements of the striker. Its circumference should not be changed under any circumstances. However, the Elle bat could be bound with the material without using any metal in order to protect it from breaking or being damaged.
Until such time as a special ball is specifically made for Elle, tennis balls are used. The fur on the ball could be removed/shaved before use but removing of fur to make the rubber visible is strictly prohibited. A rubber ball or another light ball could be used instead of a tennis ball, but it is of paramount importance that the ball used should be common to both teams.

References 

Traditional Sri Lankan sports
Ball and bat games
Team sports